is a Japanese actress who is formerly affiliated with Japan Action Enterprise. She is best known for her role as the character Yoko Minato/Kamen Rider Marika, from the Kamen Rider series Kamen Rider Gaim.

Biography
Tsukui graduated from Japan Action Enterprise's 37th class. Her skills are jazz dancing, hip hop, and sewing. Tsukui's hobbies are theater appreciation and aroma. Her favorite food is natto rice, fried chicken, hamburger, cheese, peach, and chocolate. While she was played as villains, Tsukui wanted to be a heroine. After leaving Juken Sentai Gekiranger, she think that she is not suitable for the role of Lingshi, but a subsequent suit actor was not in charge, Kamen Rider Gaim producer Naomi Takebe requested that she was both responsible for the suit actor after transformation and before transformation. While synchronized by JAE's Satoshi Fujita, Tsukui served as Hopper Dopant in Kamen Rider W served with Fujita, and in Kamen Rider Gaim her after transformation of her role is played by her as well, such as the role as Kamen Rider Marika she had. She and Fujita were physique such as the size of the belt is the same but not almost the same, he said that it is better for her is a small thigh but also thin face. As of 2021, she is currently a freelancer.

Filmography

TV series

Films

Live Stages

References

External links
 Official profile at Japan Action Enterprise (PDF) 

Japanese actresses
1987 births
Living people
Actors from Saitama Prefecture